Vickie Lynn Benson (formerly Guerrero, née Lara; born April 16, 1968) is an American professional wrestling personality and manager. She is best known for her time in WWE, under the ring name Vickie Guerrero. She is currently signed to All Elite Wrestling (AEW) as the manager of Nyla Rose and Marina Shafir.

In wrestling, she has appeared as an on-screen authority figure, storyline lover to several WWE wrestlers, occasional professional wrestler in the WWE Divas division, and as a manager for numerous wrestlers. She was best known in her role as General Manager of SmackDown from 2007 to 2011, and of Raw from 2011 to 2013. Since leaving WWE in 2014, she has made sporadic appearances in the company.

She is known for her villainous persona and igniting negative reactions from audiences with her catchphrase, "Excuse me!". She is the widow of professional wrestler Eddie Guerrero, which has been occasionally incorporated into WWE storylines.

Professional wrestling career

World Wrestling Entertainment/WWE

Storyline with Eddie and Chavo (2005–2006) 
In 2005, Vickie Guerrero made her debut as a face with her husband Eddie Guerrero and Rey Mysterio, when a storyline escalated in which Eddie promised to reveal a secret concerning Mysterio's son, Dominik. Vickie was on the July 14 episode of SmackDown! with two of Eddie's three daughters to stop Eddie from revealing Mysterio's secret. Eddie promised not to reveal the secret, he lost to Mysterio at The Great American Bash, though that turned out to be another one of his character's trademark lies, as Eddie revealed that Dominik was really his (kayfabe) biological son. Vickie later reappeared at SummerSlam to convince Eddie to put a stop to his war with Mysterio and not to go through with the "Custody of Dominik" ladder match that night. When that failed, she cost him the match by pushing over the ladder he was on as he was about to win. After that she held down Eddie on the ground afterwards so he couldn't get up and attack Mysterio. On November 13, 2005, Eddie Guerrero died of heart failure in his Minneapolis hotel room and was found by his nephew Chavo. On-screen, this led to Rey Mysterio, Eddie's real-life friend, getting more screen time and higher profile matches, including defeating Kurt Angle and Randy Orton at WrestleMania 22 for the World Heavyweight Championship. The night before WrestleMania, Eddie was posthumously inducted into the WWE Hall of Fame, and Vickie accepted the honor on his behalf.

In 2006, approximately seven or eight months after Eddie's death, Vickie started appearing more prominently in more controversial storylines. She first asserted herself during a feud between Mysterio and Chavo Guerrero when Chavo accused Mysterio of being "nothing but a leech living off the blood of the Guerrero name" on the August 4 SmackDown!. Subsequently, she acted as peacemaker between the two former friends until she seemingly inadvertently interfered in their match at SummerSlam in 2006, costing Mysterio the match. Vickie later openly sided with Chavo and hit Mysterio in the back with a chair on the following SmackDown!, turning heel in the process. On the September 1 SmackDown!, the evil Vickie declared herself Chavo's business manager and Mysterio an "insignificant chapter" in her past. At No Mercy, Chavo lost to Mysterio in a Falls Count Anywhere match. On October 20, Rey Mysterio lost an "I Quit" match against Chavo after interference from Vickie.

On October 27, 2006, Chris Benoit became involved in the storyline. He tried to figure out what Vickie was doing with Eddie's estate while also defending the WWE United States Championship in a rivalry with Chavo. At Survivor Series, Chavo kicked out of an attempted sharpshooter, causing Benoit to knock Vickie off the ring apron and on her head, causing her to begin to wear a neck brace and blame Benoit for "intentionally" hitting her. At the end of December, she interfered in a United States Championship match between Chavo and Benoit, which caused Chavo to lose and Benoit to retain the title. As a result, Chavo shouted "If you wanted me to win the title, then stop getting me disqualified," before pushing Vickie over.

Relationship with Edge; La Familia (2007–2009) 

In May 2007, Kristal, the on-screen girlfriend of General Manager Theodore Long, convinced him to give Guerrero an interview for the position as his assistant. A week after the interview, Vickie was given the job, turning face once again. On the June 29 episode of SmackDown!, Vickie acted as interim general manager of SmackDown! while Long was planning his wedding with Kristal. She was soon named the maid of honor at Long and Kristal's "wedding". On the September 21 episode of SmackDown!, Long suffered a kayfabe heart attack during his wedding to Kristal before they had legally wed. The following week, Vince McMahon named Vickie the new General Manager. On the November 23 episode of SmackDown!, she "punished" Edge for his interference in the championship match at the Survivor Series by making him the number one contender for the World Heavyweight Championship, before revealing that she had begun a romantic relationship with him and had facilitated his "plan" to regain the belt. As a result, Vickie turned heel once again. Later in the night, as she stood alone in the ring, after watching Edge be attacked by Batista, The Undertaker appeared and performed a Tombstone Piledriver on Vickie. After being off-air for several weeks, she returned on the December 14 episode of SmackDown! in a wheelchair, making biased matches in favor of Edge which led to him winning the World Heavyweight Championship at Armageddon.

In early 2008, she formed La Familia with her nephew Chavo, Edge, the team of Curt Hawkins and Zack Ryder, and later, Bam Neely. One of her first acts as part of the new group was to help Chavo win the ECW Championship from CM Punk. At the Royal Rumble, Vickie interfered in the World Heavyweight Championship match between Edge and Rey Mysterio, allowing Edge to retain his title. On the subsequent airing of SmackDown, Edge proposed to Vickie, who accepted, but the event was interrupted by Mysterio. After Vickie had helped Edge to retain his championship for almost four months, he eventually dropped the title to The Undertaker at WrestleMania XXIV. This started a feud between Edge and the Undertaker, with Vickie giving Edge numerous title opportunities and placing The Undertaker in difficult matches. On the May 2 episode of SmackDown, she stripped The Undertaker of his championship after deciding that his new gogoplata (dubbed Hell's Gate) submission hold was too dangerous and made a Tables, ladders, and chairs match at One Night Stand between The Undertaker and Edge for the vacant title with the stipulation that Undertaker would be banished from WWE if he lost. Following interference, Edge won the match and the World Heavyweight Championship and Vickie 'banished' Undertaker. However, Edge lost his title shortly afterwards to CM Punk on the June 30 episode of Raw. On the July 4 episode of SmackDown, Edge took his frustrations for losing the World Heavyweight Championship out on Vickie by telling her the wedding was off. The next week, however, Edge re-proposed to Vickie after SmackDown had gone off the air.

On the July 18 episode of SmackDown, at the wedding reception (the wedding had occurred off-screen before the show) Triple H came out and showed a video of Edge cheating on Vickie the day before with Alicia Fox, the wedding planner. The storyline continued at The Great American Bash when Fox attempted to hand Edge the WWE Championship belt to use as weapon, but was stopped with a clothesline by Vickie. Edge attempted to spear the referee to delay the match, but hit Vickie instead. Triple H used this distraction to recover and hit a Pedigree to retain his title. On the July 25 episode of SmackDown, Edge attempted to get Vickie to forgive him, but instead she announced the reinstatement of his former enemy The Undertaker, whom Edge would face at SummerSlam in a Hell in a Cell match, turning her into a face in the process. A few weeks later, as revenge, Edge attacked the members of La Familia and tipped Vickie from her wheelchair. The Undertaker refused to accept her apology for his banishment, but Vickie stated that she was not afraid of him. She also stated that at Unforgiven, she would force him to apologize to her, but at Unforgiven when The Undertaker did not comply, the Big Show knocked him out and Vickie spat in his face, turning heel once again. Big Show then aligned himself with Vickie, and for the next two weeks they continued to gloat at how they beat The Undertaker. After Undertaker attacked Chavo, Vickie pleaded with Undertaker for forgiveness for her actions. Undertaker, however, once again hit her with a Tombstone Piledriver, forcing Vickie to rely on both a neckbrace and a wheelchair again. Over the following weeks, Vickie put the Undertaker in matches against the Big Show that seemed impossible for him to win. The feud ended after Big Show lost to Undertaker in a casket match at Survivor Series.

At Survivor Series, during a match for the WWE Championship between the champion Triple H and Vladimir Kozlov, Vickie came out to the arena making the announcement that "he's here". Edge's music was played and he came out to compete, making it a triple threat match. Edge won the championship, and as he went to the back, he greeted Vickie with a hug. On the December 5 episode of SmackDown they shared a kiss, thus reinstating their on-screen relationship. On the special December 8 episode of Raw, Vickie and Edge won a Slammy Award for the Couple of the Year.

On February 23, 2009, she was appointed the interim General Manager of Raw during Stephanie McMahon's absence. On the following Raw, Guerrero announced that Edge would be facing Big Show for his World Heavyweight Championship at WrestleMania 25. On the March 9 episode of Raw, John Cena showed footage of Vickie cheating on Edge with Big Show after Guerrero had added Cena to the World Heavyweight Title match through blackmail of revealing the secret affair, making it a triple threat in the process. At WrestleMania, Edge lost the World Heavyweight Championship to Cena after Cena pinned Big Show after Cena delivered the Attitude Adjustment to Edge onto the Big Show. On the April 6 episode of Raw, Guerrero was given the choice of either being General Manager of Raw or SmackDown. She then announced that she would move to Raw in order to become its new General Manager, subsequently resulting in her being separated from Edge. However, Big Show and her nephew Chavo were also moved to Raw during the 2009 WWE Draft and Supplemental Draft, respectively.

After being insulted for a few weeks because of her weight by Santino Marella, Vickie, with help from William Regal, won the "Miss WrestleMania" crown from Santina Marella, Santino's "twin sister", in a No Disqualification match sanctioned by Chavo on the May 18 episode of Raw. On June 7 at the Extreme Rules pay-per-view, Vickie lost the "Miss WrestleMania" crown to Santina in a hog pen match with Chavo by her side. The following night on Raw, Vickie announced her resignation as Raw's General Manager. After her announcement, Edge came out and told Vickie that he was sorry for saying disrespectful things about her, only to reveal that he only married her so she could help him in World Championship matches, and now that she quit, she was useless to him in his endeavors to become the champion again. He then told Vickie that he wanted a divorce, leading to her suffering from a nervous breakdown. In reality, Vickie had requested to leave WWE so that she could spend more time with her family.

Managing LayCool (2009–2010) 

Guerrero returned to WWE on the SmackDown 10th Anniversary special episode on October 2, with a drastically changed new look, where she introduced her storyline boyfriend, then-heel, Eric Escobar, who she would be managing on the SmackDown brand. On the November 20 SmackDown, Guerrero was named as a SmackDown consultant by WWE Chairman Vince McMahon. The following week after Escobar failed to capture the Intercontinental title from John Morrison, Vickie ended their relationship. Escobar claimed that he could not take it any longer, saying he only went out with her for power, mirroring what Edge admitted as to why he had married Vickie on the June 8 episode of Raw. Guerrero then put him in a handicap match with The Hart Dynasty the following week, and the week after put him in another handicap match against Chris Jericho and Big Show. The storyline was soon dropped when Escobar was released by WWE.

Guerrero began involving herself in the already heated rivalry between WWE Women's Champion Mickie James and Michelle McCool and Layla, taking the sides of Team LayCool after Mickie accidentally doused her with cottage cheese on the February 12 episode of 
SmackDown. On the February 26 SmackDown, Guerrero acted as special guest referee for a title match between James and McCool, ultimately costing James the title after slapping her. Two weeks later she got involved in a match between WWE Women's Champion Michelle McCool and Tiffany causing Tiffany to win the match by DQ. After the match, McCool and Layla began to beat down Tiffany until Beth Phoenix made the save, in the process delivering a clothesline to Vickie. Two weeks later Guerrerro appeared in a 5-on-1 handicap match with Alicia Fox, Maryse and Team LayCool against Beth Phoenix. Guerrero mainly hid behind Alicia Fox, Maryse, and Team LayCool, letting her partners do the dirty work until Phoenix was weakened and Guerrero made the pin, winning the match. At WrestleMania XXVI, Guerrero's team won a 10-woman tag team match when she climbed the turnbuckle and gestured to the sky before connecting a frog splash, as tribute to her late husband, Eddie. On the May 10 episode of Raw, Guerrero was named the permanent general manager of the Raw brand for the second time, but then resigned on the same night after being intimidated by Randy Orton. Although not the general manager, she returned to SmackDown as the Consultant on the May 14 episode and forced Phoenix to face Team LayCool in a handicap match, which Layla won to achieve her first WWE Women's Championship.

Managing Dolph Ziggler (2010–2012) 

In June she began a romance storyline with Dolph Ziggler and began accompanying him to the ring. On the August 31 episode of NXT, it was announced that Vickie would be the storyline mentor of Aloisia for the all-female third season. However, due to certain circumstances, Aloisia was sent to Florida Championship Wrestling, WWE's developmental system and was later released. Vickie was assigned a new rookie on the show, Kaitlyn, whom she began feuding with. On October 5, she was defeated by Kaitlyn in a rookie versus pro match. Kaitlyn was caught backstage kissing Vickie's boyfriend, Ziggler, which added more fuel to the fire. Kaitlyn went on to win NXT and later joined SmackDown.

In January 2011, she became the acting General Manager of SmackDown after Theodore Long was found unconscious backstage. At the Royal Rumble pay-per-view, Kelly Kelly attacked Guerrero during Ziggler's match with Edge. On the February 4 episode of SmackDown, Ziggler and LayCool lost to Edge and Kelly in a two-on-three handicapped mix tag match for the World Heavyweight Championship. Afterwards, Guerrero fired Kelly, and announced a championship match between Edge and Ziggler, with her serving as the special guest referee of the match. The following week, while officiating the match, she attempted to spear Edge but injured her ankle as part of the storyline. While she was down, Clay Matthews of the Green Bay Packers replaced her as referee, and Edge went on to win the match. On SmackDowns 600th episode the following week, she stripped Edge of the title and fired him in the storyline. Later that night, there was a coronation for Ziggler as World Heavyweight Champion. However, the returning Theodore Long revealed that he was once again in charge and that Vickie and Ziggler were the culprits behind his assault, thus making an impromptu match between Ziggler and a reinstated Edge for the World Heavyweight Championship, in which Edge won. After the match, Long fired Ziggler. On the February 25 episode of SmackDown, Long announced that a match would take place with Edge and Kelly Kelly facing Vickie and Drew McIntyre. Vickie lost the match, and was then fired (kayfabe) from her consultant role by Long.

On the March 7 episode of Raw, Guerrero and Ziggler made their return to the brand, with Vickie managing him in a singles match defeating John Morrison. After the match, the anonymous Raw General Manager informed Vickie that Ziggler had indeed been hired, but they did not hire her yet. The general manager then continued by issuing a match between her and Trish Stratus for the following week, with the stipulation being if Vickie wins, she would be hired. The following week, Vickie defeated Trish in a No Disqualification match with the help of Team LayCool. Afterwards, Guerrero challenged Stratus, Morrison, and that week's Raw guest star Snooki, who had slapped Guerrero earlier in the night, to a six-person mixed tag team match against LayCool and Ziggler at WrestleMania XXVII, which they accepted. On the March 21 episode of Raw, Guerrero, LayCool, and Ziggler lost to Stratus and Morrison in a 4-on-2 handicap match. At WrestleMania XXVII, Vickie's team of LayCool and Ziggler were defeated by Snooki, Stratus, and Morrison. The night after WrestleMania, on Raw, Vickie and Ziggler were defeated by Stratus and Morrison.

At the Capitol Punishment pay-per-view, Ziggler won the United States Championship from Kofi Kingston, with the help of Guerrero. The next night on Raw, Ziggler retained the championship from Kingston by disqualification. Later that night, Vickie lost a dance contest to Michael Cole, despite Cole receiving the most boos. On the September 12 Raw, Vickie lost to the Divas Champion, Kelly Kelly, due to Ziggler fighting with Jack Swagger. On the September 19 Raw after weeks of pursuing for Vickie's services, Jack Swagger convinced Vickie to sign a managerial contract. At Tables, Ladders & Chairs, Ziggler lost the United States Championship to Zack Ryder, who lost the title to Swagger on the January 16, 2012, episode of Raw. On the March 5 Raw, Swagger lost the United States Championship to Santino Marella. On the June 18 episode of Raw, Vickie ended her clientele service with Jack Swagger and renewed her romantic relationship with Ziggler.

 Final storylines and departure (2012–2014) 
After showing "evidence" to the WWE Board of Directors of AJ Lee "fraternizing" with a WWE wrestler – which was later stated as John Cena – AJ was asked to resign. On the October 22 episode of Raw, Mr. McMahon announced Guerrero as the new Raw Managing Supervisor. On the December 10 episode of Raw, Guerrero defeated AJ with help from Brad Maddox, who was the special referee for the match. At the Tables, Ladders & Chairs pay-per-view, Guerrero tried to help Dolph Ziggler in his ladder match against Cena, until she was attacked by AJ, who betrayed Cena and helped Ziggler win. The following night on Raw, Guerrero teamed with Cena to defeat the new couple of Ziggler and AJ by disqualification due to interference from Big E Langston.

On the February 18, 2013, episode of Raw, Guerrero named Brad Maddox as her assistant, where Maddox came up with the name of Team Brickie. In mid-2013, Vickie entered a storyline where Vince McMahon, Stephanie McMahon, and Triple H pressured her to increase the level of her authority. On the July 8 episode of Raw, after undergoing a job evaluation, the fans did not vote in Vickie's favor, resulting in her getting fired by Stephanie McMahon. Vince McMahon tried to console her afterwards, and appointed her assistant, Brad Maddox, as the new General Manager.

On the July 19 episode of SmackDown, Vince McMahon hired Guerrero as the new General Manager of SmackDown. Guerrero told the fans she hated each and every one of them, blaming them for her getting fired as Managing Supervisor of Raw. In addition to this, when Maddox congratulated her, Guerrero slapped him, and in revenge for having security escort her out by Teddy Long's orders the week before, Vickie had Long escorted out by security. On the October 7 episode of Raw, after announcing that Alberto Del Rio would defend the World Heavyweight Championship against John Cena at Hell in a Cell, she distracted Del Rio in his match against Ricardo Rodriguez, allowing Rodriguez to pick up the win. Following this, Vickie argued with Kane and Brad Maddox over who should be in charge. On the November 18 episode of Raw, Stephanie McMahon forced Guerrero to compete in a match against the Divas Champion AJ Lee, which she lost. On March 24, 2014, episode of Raw, after hearing insulting comments from AJ towards her, Guerrero forced AJ to defend her Divas Championship in a 14-woman "Vickie Guerrero Invitational" at WrestleMania XXX. On the June 16 episode of Raw, Roman Reigns tried to convince Vickie to put him into the battle royal for a WWE World Heavyweight Championship opportunity at Money in the Bank pay-per-view, Vickie however refused, because The Authority wouldn't allow him in it. Reigns then spiked the coffee she gave to Stephanie McMahon, causing Stephanie to throw up on Vickie and leave with Triple H to the hospital. Vickie later gave Reigns a chance in the battle royal, which he won. On June 23 episode of Raw, Vickie lost in a pudding match against Stephanie McMahon with her job on the line, after interference by Alicia Fox, Layla and Rosa Mendes. Vickie also ultimately lost the match and she was fired as general manager of both shows, got her retribution over McMahon by throwing her into the mud pool and mouthed, "I love you"; a tribute to her late husband, Eddie Guerrero, and performed his signature taunt while leaving the stage, turning face for the first time since 2006. This was done to write her off television, as she had requested her release a few months before.

 Sporadic appearances (2016, 2018) 
On the July 4, 2016 episode of Raw, Vickie returned to WWE as a villainess once again, announcing her intentions to become the new "SmackDown Chief Operating Officer" after the WWE Brand Extension returned on July 19; however, she was escorted out of the arena by two security guards. While being escorted out, Vickie encountered Dolph Ziggler backstage, who denied knowing her at all.

On January 28, 2018, at the Royal Rumble, Guerrero made a surprise entrance at number 16 during the first women's Royal Rumble match, in which she was eliminated by Becky Lynch, Michelle McCool, Ruby Riott, & Sasha Banks in 57 seconds. Afterwards, she attacked Carmella, who entered at number 17, by hitting her with her Money in the Bank briefcase. On the 1000th episode of Smackdown she returned as a face

 All Elite Wrestling (2019–present) 
On December 11, 2019, she appeared as a guest commentator for All Elite Wrestling taping of AEW Dark Episode 11 that premiered December 17, 2019 on YouTube. According to Guerrero, this appearance caused WWE to "cut her off". On July 15, 2020, at Fight for the Fallen, Guerrero was revealed as Nyla Rose's manager. On the June 4, 2021, Guerrero also revealed Andrade El Idolo as her new client.

Professional wrestling style and persona
Guerrero's approach to her work as manager is "to make them shine and do my little part and just be there at the right moment and the right time to do the right thing" while "my role is just an embellishment of the superstar that’s in the ring. I don’t want to overshadow them". She uses the catchphrase "Excuse me".

 Other media 
Guerrero has appeared in two video games. She made her in-game debut in WWE '12 as a playable DLC character and in WWE 2K15 as an exclusive manager for the Microsoft Windows, Xbox One and PlayStation 4 versions.

In 2019, Guerrero began hosting her own podcast, Excuse Me: The Vickie Guerrero Show.

Personal life
Guerrero is a Christian of French and Mexican descent. Vickie married Eddie Guerrero on April 24, 1990, after three years of dating. Guerrero's father encouraged them to marry following the announcement of Vickie's first pregnancy. Together, Vickie and Eddie had two daughters: Shaul Marie Guerrero (born October 14, 1990), who is married to fellow professional wrestler Aiden English, and Sherilyn Amber Guerrero (born July 8, 1995). They were married until his death.

On June 18, 2015, Vickie announced her engagement to partner Kris Benson, and the two were married on September 12, 2015.

After leaving WWE in 2014, she revealed her plans to start a new career in medical administration. Vickie became officially certified as a medical office administrator and was hired by a pharmaceutical company as a medical administrator. In 2019, she graduated from Herzing University with a Bachelor of Science in healthcare administration.

Awards and accomplishmentsThe Baltimore SunNon-Wrestler of the Year (2008)World Wrestling Entertainment/WWEMiss WrestleMania (1 time)
Slammy Award 
Couple of the Year (2008) – with EdgeWrestling Observer Newsletter'''''
Best Non-Wrestler (2009, 2010)

References

Further reading

External links

1968 births
All Elite Wrestling personnel
American color commentators
American female professional wrestlers
American people of French descent
American professional wrestlers of Mexican descent
American women podcasters
American podcasters
Christians from Texas
Living people
Los Guerreros
People from El Paso, Texas
Professional wrestlers from Texas
Professional wrestling announcers
Professional wrestling authority figures
Professional wrestling managers and valets
Professional wrestling podcasters
Professional wrestling referees
Twitch (service) streamers
YouTubers from Texas
21st-century American women
American actresses of Mexican descent